Ramnagar Manikyam Shankara, best known as R. M. Shankara, is a two-time World Carrom Champion from Karnataka, India. He has been a several-time Indian national champion, beginning with this victory at Jalandhar in 2000.

Achievements
 Winner : Karnataka State Carrom Championship 2000 
 Winner : Senior National Championship 2000(Jalandhar)
 Winner : World Championship 2000
 Winner : Malaysian Open International 2000
 Winner : 2nd U.S Open 2003
 Winner : International Carrom Federation Cup, Cannes 2003
 Winner : Senior National 2003(Bangalore)
 Winner : SAARC Championship, Dhaka 2003
 Winner :Indo - Sri Lanka Test 2002 & 2004
 Runner Up: World Cup 2001, Lutton

References

External links
 Punjab State Carrom Association (Reg'd.)

Living people
Indian carrom players
Year of birth missing (living people)
Place of birth missing (living people)
Game players from Karnataka